Ricardo Jorge Rodrigues Pessoa (born 5 February 1982) is a Portuguese former footballer who played as a right-back.

He spent most of his 17-year professional career with Portimonense, but also competed in the Primeira Liga with Vitória de Setúbal and Moreirense. He made a record 359 appearances in LigaPro.

Club career
Born in Vendas Novas, Évora District, Pessoa started his professional career with Vitória de Setúbal, being sparingly used during his four-year spell with the Sado River club. He played 20 games as it returned to the Primeira Liga in 2004 after one year of absence, but only made ten appearances at that level over three seasons.

In the summer of 2005, Pessoa returned to the second division and signed for Portimonense SC, being an undisputed starter from the beginnings and also eventually gaining captaincy. In the 2009–10 campaign, he scored six goals– whilst taking part in all 30 league matches – as the Algarve team returned to the top flight after 20 years.

Aged 35, Pessoa managed another promotion with his main club in 2017, contributing four goals (again mostly from penalties) from 29 appearances. On 25 May that year, he renewed his contract until 2020.

Pessoa retired at the end of the 2017–18 season, having featured sparingly as Portimonense retained their league status due to injury. During his 12-year spell in Portimão, he played 426 matches in all competitions.

International career
Pessoa played once for Portugal at under-21 level, playing the last 14 minutes of the 2–2 friendly draw against Norway held in Guarda.

Career statistics

Honours
Vitória Setúbal
Taça de Portugal: 2004–05

Portimonense
Segunda Liga: 2016–17

References

External links

1982 births
Living people
Sportspeople from Évora District
Portuguese footballers
Association football defenders
Primeira Liga players
Liga Portugal 2 players
Vitória F.C. players
Portimonense S.C. players
Moreirense F.C. players
Portugal youth international footballers
Portugal under-21 international footballers
Portugal B international footballers